Bigsby may refer to:

Christopher Bigsby (born 1941), British literary analyst and novelist
John Jeremiah Bigsby (1792-1881), English physician and geologist
Bigsby Medal, a medal of the Geological Society of London established by John Jeremiah Bigsby, awarded for the study of American geology
Paul Bigsby (1899–1968), American guitar maker, inventor and motorcycle racer/mechanic
Bigsby Electric Guitars, a company named after Paul Bigsby
Bigsby vibrato tailpiece, a vibrato device for electric guitars invented by Paul Bigsby
Robert Bigsby (1806–73), English antiquarian and author
Tank Bigsby (born 2001), American football player

See also
 Bigsby & Kruthers, a high-profile men's clothier in Chicago 1970-2000
Bixby (disambiguation)
 Chandler-Bigsby-Abbot House, a historic house in Andover, Massachusetts